Robert Wendell Long (born February 24, 1934) is a former American football linebacker in the National Football League (NFL) for the Los Angeles Rams, Detroit Lions and Dallas Cowboys. He played college football at the University of California at Los Angeles.

Early years
Long attended South Pasadena High School, before moving on to the University of California at Los Angeles. In 1954, he was a part of the team that shared the national championship with Ohio State University.

Professional career

Los Angeles Rams
Long was selected by the Los Angeles Rams in the second round (18th overall) of the 1955 NFL Draft. On October 2, he was traded to the Detroit Lions in exchange for a draft choice.

Detroit Lions
The  converted Long from a defensive end into a linebacker. In 1957, he was a starter at linebacker for the NFL Championship winning team. On July 20, 1960, he was traded along with a first round draft choice (#10-Bobby Crespino), to the Cleveland Browns in exchange for quarterback Jim Ninowski.

Cleveland Browns
On August 17, 1960, he was traded to the Los Angeles Rams in exchange for offensive end Leon Clarke.

Los Angeles Rams
In 1960, he played in 9 games. In 1961, he played in 13 games. He was released on September 4, 1962. On September 7, he was traded to the Dallas Cowboys along with defensive tackle John Meyers, in exchange for a third round draft choice (#32-Willie Brown).

Dallas Cowboys
In 1962, he was a backup linebacker, appearing in 8 games.

Personal life
In 1983, he was an assistant football coach at Kansas State University.

References

1934 births
Living people
Sportspeople from Los Angeles County, California
Players of American football from California
American football linebackers
UCLA Bruins football players
Los Angeles Rams players
People from South Pasadena, California
Detroit Lions players
Dallas Cowboys players
Kansas State Wildcats football coaches